Bruno Esono Ondo Mengue (born 14 April 1992) is a Spanish-born Equatoguinean professional basketball player who plays as a shooting guard and a small forward for Costone Siena and the Equatorial Guinea national team. He also holds Italian citizenship.

Early life
Ondo Mengue was born in Madrid to Equatorial Guinean parents.

Professional career
Ondo Mengue has developed his entire club career in Italy.

In 2019, Ondo Mengue signed with Scandone Avellino in Italy's Serie B Basket.

International career
Ondo Mengue has joined the Equatorial Guinea national basketball team in January 2020. He has previously represented Italy at under–16, under–18 and under–20 levels.

References 

1992 births
Living people
Citizens of Equatorial Guinea through descent
Equatoguinean men's basketball players
Shooting guards
Small forwards
Spanish men's basketball players
Basketball players from Madrid
Spanish sportspeople of Equatoguinean descent
Spanish emigrants to Italy
Naturalised citizens of Italy
Italian men's basketball players
Italian people of Equatoguinean descent
Italian sportspeople of African descent
A.S. Stella Azzurra players
Pallacanestro Trieste players
Veroli Basket players
Mens Sana Basket players
Pallacanestro Trapani players
S.S. Felice Scandone players